Thomas B. Silver (1947 – December 26, 2001) was an American author and scholar who was president of the Claremont Institute. His first book, Coolidge and the Historians, a biography of President Calvin Coolidge, was considered to be a favorite of a later president, Ronald Reagan. He had a bachelor's degree in political science from Kalamazoo College and a doctorate in government from Claremont Graduate School.

He died of an aggressive brain tumor at St. Jude's Hospital in Fullerton, California, at the age of 54.

References

1947 births
2001 deaths
20th-century American historians
American male non-fiction writers
Kalamazoo College alumni
Claremont Graduate University alumni
Deaths from brain cancer in the United States
Deaths from cancer in California
Historians from California
20th-century American male writers